Daniel Cameron (c.1819 – 3 January 1906) was an miner and politician in colonial Victoria, a member of the Victorian Legislative Council and later, the Victorian Legislative Assembly.

Cameron was born in Perthshire, Scotland and arrived in Melbourne in 1851 or 1852 and soon went to Beechworth, Victoria. There he mined for gold and became a gold buyer for the Bank of New South Wales.

On 15 November 1855, Cameron was elected to the unicameral Victorian Legislative Council for Ovens, a position he held until the original Council was abolished in March 1856.

Cameron was elected to the Legislative Assembly seat of Ovens in November 1856, resigning in March 1857. He died in Lilydale, Victoria on 3 January 1906. He was unmarried.

External links

References

 

1819 births
1906 deaths
Members of the Victorian Legislative Council
Members of the Victorian Legislative Assembly
People from Perthshire
Scottish emigrants to colonial Australia
19th-century Australian politicians